The Helgoland Island air disaster occurred on 9 September 1913 after the airship Zeppelin LZ 14 had been transferred to the Imperial German Navy on 7 October 1912. As the first airship owned by the Navy, it was given the serial number L-1. Ordered to participate in manoeuvers, it departed the mainland in bad weather. The control car sank, drowning 13 of its occupants. Seven were rescued by motor torpedo boats.

See also
 
List of Zeppelins

References 
 

Aviation accidents and incidents in 1913
1913 in Germany
Heligoland
Aviation accidents and incidents in Germany
Aviation accidents and incidents in the North Sea
Accidents and incidents involving balloons and airships